Vellikizhamai 13am Thethi is a 2016 Indian Tamil-language comedy horror film directed by Pugazhmani and starring Rathan Mouli, Shravya, and Suza Kumar.

Plot 
Raasathi is an adamant girl and her father is ready to do anything that she asks. On one such day, her father buys a piece of land under her name and build a marriage hall on top of it. Raasathi is persuaded by her mother to get married, but the groom gets angry and puts the hall on fire after he learns that Raasathi is having an affair with someone else. Thirteen people die in the fire. An enchanter advises Raasathi  that if she is married in the same hall, then all of the evil spirits will die off. Her brother Ramakrishnan assigns Saravanan and his group of friends the job of renovating the hall. How Saravanan and his group of friends rid the hall of spirits forms the rest of the story. Along the way, Saravanan meets his friend Malliga.

Cast 

Rathan Mouli as Saravanan
Shravya as Raasathi
Suza Kumar as Malliga
Livingston as Ganesan, a fan of Sivaji
Ramji as Ramakrishnan, Raasathi's brother
Raandilya as a ghost
M. S. Bhaskar as Saravanan's friend
 Manobala as the comical doctor
Chitra Lakshmanan as Raasathi's father
Chaams as Saravanan's friend
Vaiyapuri as Saravanan's friend
Rekha as Saravanan's mother
Nirosha as Ganesan's younger sister
Madhumitha as Raasathi's friend
Rangamma Paati as Paati
E. Ramdoss as Raasathi's to-be father-in-law

Production 
Rathan Mouli plays the male lead in the film. Telugu actress Shravya, who was a part of Love You Bangaram, was signed to play the lead actress. The film marks her Tamil debut and she portrays a ghost in the film. Suza Kumar, who starred alongside Rathan Mouli in, was cast to play the second actress and appears post-interval.  Raandilya, who played a role in Vanmam, portrayed a ghost in the film. In September of 2015, the film reached the post-production phase.

Release 
Malini Mannath of The New Indian Express wrote that "An average entertainer, the film could have done with better content and definitely with more style". On the contrary, a critic from Maalaimalar  praised the director's effort and the performances of the lead cast, the background music, and the cinematography.

References 

Indian comedy horror films
 2016 comedy horror films
 2010s Tamil-language films